A black powder substitute is a replacement for black powder used in muzzleloading and cartridge firearms.  Black powder substitutes offer a number of advantages over black powder, primarily including reduced sensitivity as an explosive and increased efficiency as a propellant powder.

Types

Hodgdon's Pyrodex was the first widely available substitute on the market.  Pyrodex is less sensitive to ignition than black powder, and uses the same shipping and storage guidelines as smokeless powder.  Pyrodex is more energetic per unit of mass than black powder, but it is less dense, and can be substituted at a 1:1 ratio by volume for black powder in many applications.  Pyrodex is similar in composition to black powder, consisting primarily of charcoal, sulfur, and potassium nitrate, but it also contains graphite and potassium perchlorate, plus additional ingredients protected by trade secret.  Originally available as loose powder in two granularities, RS (Rifle/Shotgun) equal to FFG black powder, and P (Pistol) equal to FFFg black powder, Pyrodex is now becoming available in Select and solid pellet varieties.  While Pyrodex offers improved safety and increased efficiency (in terms of shots per pound of powder) over black powder, the level of fouling is similar; Pyrodex is caustic and corrosive. Therefore, the same cleaning regimen used on black-powder fouling must be employed when Pyrodex has been used.

Hodgdon also makes Triple Seven, one of the family of sulfurless black powder substitutes.  Triple Seven and Black Mag3 are more energetic by mass than black powder, and can produce higher velocities and pressures. Triple Seven is a volumetric substitute for black powder but produces higher velocity. To match the velocities of a traditional black powder load it is recommended to reduce the load by 15%. Still burning carbon, the carbon-based fuel burned here is from the sugar family, not from charcoal. 

Western Powders Company introduced Blackhorn 209 in 2008. Like many other black powder substitutes, it is made to be a volumetric substitute of black powder. It is dispensed in "black powder powder measures" for muzzleloading applications.  Blackhorn 209 is essentially non-corrosive, low-fouling, very consistent in gas generation, but non-hygroscopic.

Measurement

The grain is the traditional measurement of the weight of bullets, black powder, and smokeless powder in English-speaking countries.  It is the unit measured by the scales used in handloading; commonly, bullets are measured in increments of one grain, gunpowder in increments of 0.1 grains. There are 7,000 grains in one pound. 

Pyrodex, and most other black powder substitutes, are formulated to be a volume-for-volume equivalent of black powder, not an equivalent mass-for-mass (weight-for-weight). Pyrodex is measured by volumetric measurement techniques, not in grains on a scale, due to the difference in density of Pyrodex versus black powder. For example, to measure a "60 grain equivalent" of Hodgdon's Pyrodex suitable for use in a muzzleloader rifle, one uses a volumetric measure that produces a volume of Pyrodex equal to the volume of a mass of 60 grains of black powder.  Due to Pyrodex being less dense than black powder, a measurement by weight on a scale of 60 grains of mass of Pyrodex would be near a 30 percent overload. 

Volume equivalence is a benefit in loading muzzleloading firearms, traditionally loaded using volumetric measures. This becomes an issue when fabricating black-powder cartridges through handloading using a black-powder substitute in place of black powder, since it is common practice to measure by weight when loading cartridges  (there are published conversion tables).

Disadvantages
With the increased safety of the black powder substitutes often comes a reduced sensitivity to ignition.  Flintlocks in particular need very sensitive, finely granulated powder for use in the flash pan, and black powder tends to perform more reliably in these and traditional caplock guns than substitutes.  Modern in-line muzzleloaders provide a stronger ignition than traditional designs, and this helps to increase reliability with the less flame sensitive substitutes.  In addition, magnum percussion caps are often recommended for use with black powder substitutes for both inline and traditional caplock guns, in place of the #11 percussion caps traditionally used with black powder in these guns, to achieve the best ignition reliability.

When used for recovery system ejection charges in high-power rocketry, black powder substitutes need a greater degree of confinement to ensure a complete burn and generation of sufficient ejection pressure. This can be achieved by wrapping 2–3 layers of electrical tape over the ejection charge canister before installation.

Legality

United States
By property insurance and federal transportation regulations, black powder substitutes also can be transported and stored in interstate commerce in the United States using smokeless powder regulations, instead of the much more restrictive black powder regulations. Because of this, black powder substitutes are thus becoming more commonly available than traditional black powder, which has largely vanished from the shelves of most retailers.

United Kingdom
Unlike black powder, Pyrodex does not require a licence to buy or store. Also a Recipient Competent Authority (RCA) transfer document is not required for Pyrodex. Black powder must be stored in a wooden box constructed to certain precise specifications, but Pyrodex can be stored like any other modern propellant.

References

Pyrodex MSDS Material safety data sheet
Triple Seven MSDS

External links
rec.guns FAQ on black powder and substitutes
BLACK POWDER, PYRODEX AND THE NEW LOW RESIDUE POWDERS
What is the Difference between Black, Pyrodex, Triple Seven, and Smokeless Powders? by Randy Wakeman (2004).
Goex powders—current black powder and black powder substitute products
Pyrodex Tests—Information and comparative tests of various BP substitutes in high-power rocketry ejection systems

Firearm propellants